Formula One 2002 is a racing video game developed by Studio Liverpool and published by Sony Computer Entertainment exclusively for PlayStation 2. It is a sequel to the 2001 video game Formula One 2001 and was based on the 2002 Formula One World Championship.

The first issues of this game came with a DVD of the 2001 Formula One World Championship that was not commercially released which featured multi-angles and footage from the defunct F1 Digital, a pay-per-view service which allowed the purchaser access to multiple camera shots, sessions and a choice to follow cars as the sessions progressed.

Gameplay
The game features all the drivers and tracks from the 2002 Formula One World Championship, but does not represent the replacement driver that featured in the real 2002 Formula One World Championship, therefore Anthony Davidson is not featured. Although the Arrows team collapsed after the 2002 German Grand Prix in the real 2002 Formula One World Championship, players and AI can still drive Arrows cars in later Grands Prix in the game.

This marked the first ever Formula One game to feature the Launch Control and Traction Control despite the system being introduced prior to the 2001 Spanish Grand Prix.

Alcohol related tobacco sponsors
All related tobacco sponsors are censored:
Ferrari's Marlboro is completely censored.
Jaguar's Beck's is replaced By "Best's".
Williams' Veltins is replaced by the normal colour of the car.
McLaren's West is replaced by "David" and "Kimi" (just as in real life).
BAR's Lucky Strike is blocked out and replaced by "Look Alike".
Jordan's Benson & Hedges is replaced by a bar code.
Renault's Mild Seven is completely censored.

Reception

The game received "average" reviews according to the review aggregation website Metacritic. In Japan, Famitsu gave it a score of 27 out of 40.

References

External links

2002 video games
Formula One video games
Multiplayer and single-player video games
PlayStation 2 games
PlayStation 2-only games
Psygnosis games
Sony Interactive Entertainment games
Video game sequels
Video games developed in the United Kingdom
Video games set in Australia
Video games set in Malaysia
Video games set in Brazil
Video games set in Austria
Video games set in Spain
Video games set in Monaco
Video games set in Canada
Video games set in France
Video games set in the United Kingdom
Video games set in Germany
Video games set in Hungary
Video games set in Belgium
Video games set in Italy
Video games set in Indiana
Video games set in Japan